The following schools are located in Punjab, Pakistan.

Schools by district

Attock
 Army Public School and College
 Cadet College Hasan Abdal
 The City School
 Smart School Systems
 Modern Public Schools, Shinbagh
 Dar-e-Arqam Schools
 The Hazro City Girls Higher Secondary School, Hazro
 Sir Syed School, Sanjwal Cantt
 FG Boys High School, Sanjwal Cantt
 FG Girls High School, Sanjwal Cantt

Bahawalnagar
 Spring Tide English Immersion School
 The Educators
 Dar-e-Arqam Schools
 Government High School for Boys Bahawalnagar

Bahawalpur
 International School of Cordoba
 Army Public School & College
 Beaconhouse School System, Model Town
 Sadiq Public School
 Dar-e-Arqam Schools
 The City School
 The Protestant Biblical Institute
 Alpina School BWP
 Dominican Convent Higher Secondary School
 The Central School
 The Educators School
 The Allied School
 Saint Dominic Convent Higher Secondary School

Bhakkar
 Government High School for Boys Bhakkar
 The Eaglets School - Piala Chowk Bhakkar
 Dar-e-Arqam Schools

Chiniot
 AL Rehman Public ElemeCampus
 School Thattha Loona
 Government High School for Boys [[Chiniot
 Government High School for Girls Chiniot
 Dar-e-Arqam Schools
 Chenab School
 [[GHS CHAK NO 241 JB (BHOWANA)
 Meraaj School (Chiniot)

Dera Ghazi Khan
 Abdalian Science Higher Secendory School (ASHSS)
 Bloomfield Hall School (BHS)
 The City School (TCS)
 The Educators
 Lyceum High School
 Garrison Public School and College
 Punjab Group of Colleges
 KIPS
 Pearl Grammar Public School, Taunsa
 Dar-e-Arqam Schools
 DG School & College
 Government High School for Boys Dera Ghazi Khan
 Government High School for Girls Dera Ghazi Khan
 Ibne Sena Model School
 Modern Education School System, Dramah
 Wisdom Education System, New Model Town

Faisalabad

Gujranwala

 Kin's International Public High School

Gujrat

Jhang
 Chenab College Jhang
 LIFE International School Jhang

Jhelum

Kasur
 Al-Falah Model High School, Bonga Balochan
 Al-Ansaar International School, Kasur
 Mayo International Higher Secondary School, Aasadabad
 Government High School for Boys, Kasur
Govt. Boys High School, Head Balloki
 Dar-e-Arqam Schools
 Ahmad Model School System, Balloki

Khanewal
 EFA School System (STARS Campus)

Khushab
 Allied Schools
 Beaconhouse School System
 Dar-e-Arqam Schools
 Iqbal Public School
 The Right School (Mitha Tiwana Campus) Khushab
 Al Hasnat Public School (Bijar)
 Nobel School System (NSS) Jauharabad, Khushab

Lahore

Layyah
 Faisal Public High School
 Beacon Light Public High School
 The Educators
 City Public School
 Allied School, Layyah Campus
 Allied School, Kot Sultan 03008718160
 The Spirit School System

Mandi Bahauddin
 GC Kids University Mandi Bahauddin
 Government High School for Boys Mandi Bahauddin
 Eman High School Mughal Pura
 The Educators
 Dar-e-Arqam Schools
 Rangers Public School and College Mandi Bahauddin

Multan

Muzaffargarh
 Bright Kids Galaxy School System Basira 
 The Educators
 Peace Education School Alipur
 Mairi Darsgah Secondary School Kot Addu

Nankana Sahib
 Government Guru Nank High School for Boys Nankana Sahib
 Hira Public school and college
 Government girls high school
 Dar-e-Arqam Schools
 The Educators
 White Rose School System

Narowal

Okara
 Divisional Public School and College, New District Complex, Okara
 IIUI Schools Okara Campus, Okara
 Beaconhouse School System, Sahiwal Road
 The City School, Okara Branch
 International School of Cordoba, Lahore Branch
 The Educators (Al-Aleem Campus), Okara Branch
 Army Public School, Okara Cantt.
 Convent Girls & Boys High School, Okara
 Cadet College Okara

Pakpattan

Rawalpindi

Sahiwal

Sargodha

Sheikhupura
 The National Rise Model School System
 Shaheen Public School, Sharaq Pur Sharif
 The International School System
 Brookfield international grammar school
 Qaisar Girls High School (www.qs.edu.pk)

Sialkot

Toba Tek Singh
 Dar-e-Arqam Schools
 White Rose School System
 The Educators
 J. M. School System, Gojra
 Brain Cox School System, Toba Tek Singh

References

Punjab